Roger de Oliveira Bernardo (born 10 August 1985), known as Roger Bernardo or simply Roger, is a Brazilian professional footballer who plays as a defensive midfielder for Rio Claro.

Career
He has played in Brazil for the majority of his career, spending eight years in Germany with FC Energie Cottbus and FC Ingolstadt 04 before returning to his home country to join Atlético Mineiro in 2017. He left the club in May 2018 after terminating his contract and joined Hapoel Tel Aviv in July 2018.

References

External links
 
 

1985 births
Living people
Brazilian footballers
Association football midfielders
Campeonato Brasileiro Série B players
Israeli Premier League players
Bundesliga players
2. Bundesliga players
União São João Esporte Clube players
Esporte Clube Santo André players
Sociedade Esportiva Palmeiras players
América Futebol Clube (SP) players
Associação Atlética Ponte Preta players
Esporte Clube Juventude players
Guarani FC players
Figueirense FC players
Clube Atlético Mineiro players
Hapoel Tel Aviv F.C. players
Villa Nova Atlético Clube players
Rio Claro Futebol Clube players
FC Energie Cottbus players
FC Ingolstadt 04 players
Associação Atlética Internacional (Limeira) players
Brazilian expatriate footballers
Expatriate footballers in Germany
Expatriate footballers in Israel
Brazilian expatriate sportspeople in Germany
Brazilian expatriate sportspeople in Israel